North Clarendon is an unincorporated village in the town of Clarendon, Rutland County, Vermont, United States. It is part of the North Clarendon Census Designated Place, which extends north along U.S. Route 7 into the town of Rutland. North Clarendon has a post office with ZIP code 05759.

References

Census-designated places in Rutland County, Vermont
Census-designated places in Vermont
Unincorporated communities in Rutland County, Vermont
Unincorporated communities in Vermont